Manchester University NHS Foundation Trust is an NHS Acute Foundation Trust which operates 10 hospitals throughout Greater Manchester. It is the largest NHS trust in the United Kingdom, with an income of £1.6bn and 21,945 staff.

History 
It was formed by the merger of Central Manchester University Hospitals NHS Foundation Trust with the University Hospital of South Manchester NHS Foundation Trust on 1 October 2017.
The trust took over North Manchester General Hospital, which it started running since 1 April 2020 under a management agreement with Pennine Acute Hospitals NHS Trust.

Prior to the formation of the new trust, the Competition and Markets Authority decided that while the merger would substantially reduce competition among health services in the area, the benefits to patients were ‘more significant’.

The trust was formed to create the "Manchester Single Hospital Service", part of the Healthier Manchester programme to improve healthcare across the city. The aim of the Single Hospital Service mergers is to reduce health inequalities across the City of Manchester & Trafford by running the hospitals across the area together, instead of separately in the 3 previously existing hospital trusts.

Sir Mike Deegan remained the chief executive, as he was of the predecessor organisations, until 2022.  Kathy Cowell is the chair of the organisation.  In November 2022 Mark Cubbon, NHS England's chief delivery officer was appointed as chief executive.

Hospitals 
The trust runs ten hospitals across 7 sites, alongside community services, which are branded as Manchester Local Care Organisation and Trafford Local Care Organisation.

 Oxford Road Campus in Chorlton-on-Medlock
 Manchester Royal Infirmary - General Acute Hospital with full Emergency Department, and specialist medical and surgical services
 Manchester Royal Eye Hospital - Specialist Eye hospital
 Royal Manchester Children's Hospital - Specialist Paediatric Hospital
 Saint Mary's Hospital - Specialist Women's Health Hospital
 University Dental Hospital of Manchester - Specialist Dental Hospital, located near the Oxford Road Site within the University of Manchester
 South Manchester / Wythenshawe Hospital Campus
 Wythenshawe Hospital - General Acute Hospital with full Emergency Department, and specialist medical and surgical services
 Nightingale Breast Unit - Specialist Breast Unit
 North Manchester General Hospital - General Acute Hospital with full Emergency Department, and specialist medical and surgical services
 Trafford General Hospital - General Acute Hospital with Urgent Care Centre, rehabilitation and outpatient services
 Withington Community Hospital - Outpatient services
 Altrincham Hospital - Outpatient services

During the COVID-19 pandemic, the trust also ran the temporary NHS Nightingale Hospital North West, located at the Manchester Central Convention Complex.

Services 
The trust is the main provider of hospital care to approximately 750,000 people in the areas covered by the Manchester & Trafford Clinical Commissioning Groups. It is also the lead provider of multiple specialist services to the 2.8 million people in the Greater Manchester conurbation including:

 Breast
 Vascular
 Cardiac
 Respiratory
 Urology Cancer
 Paediatrics
 Women's Services
 Ophthalmology
 Genomic Medicine

The trust is also the largest single provider of specialist services in North West England. The trust is expected to become the lead provider for further sub-specialist services as part of the Manchester Single Hospital Service programme.

Developments
In January 2018 the trust secured a loan of £125 million from the Department of Health's Independent Trust Financing Facility.  £50 million was to be used for rolling out the Allscripts electronic patient record, already used in Wythenshawe, on to the Central Manchester sites. It will also enable reconfiguration of the accident and emergency departments with separation of the flow of major and minor incidents, and a new primary care assessment space at the front doors, backlog maintenance at Wythenshawe and £12 million liquidity support.  The trust decided in 2019 to use the electronic patient record system from Epic Systems, called Hive.  It will provide a new ‘operating system’ for the trust, replacing current IT systems, including electronic patient records  and Patient Administration Systems and a number of smaller specialty systems over six sites.  The £181 million contract will last for 15 years.

A helipad was built on the top of the Grafton Street car park to serve the trust's hospitals at a cost of £3.9 million, which was raised by the trust's charity, Manchester Foundation Trust Charity. It is connected to the hospitals by a 130 metre long bridge 19 metres above street level. It is expected to serve about 312 patients airlifted to the site each year. It opened in May 2021.  £1.36 million has been donated by the HELP Appeal. 

In May 2021 planning approval was given for a major expansion of the emergency department and six new operating theatres.  The work is expected to be completed in 2024.

Centrica Business Solutions has a contract to install new energy infrastructure at Withington and Wythenshawe hospitals at a cost of £10.9 million.  This will reduce their annual carbon emissions by about 25% and halve the energy bill.

In 2020 the trust started using Isansys Lifecare's Patient Status Engine, for COVID-19 patients both in hospital and at home. This collects continuous physiological data, including heart rate, respiration rate, heart rate variability, ECG, oxygen saturation, blood pressure, and body temperature. This generates an early warning score which enables earlier identification of those patients most in need of intervention.

The COVID-19 pandemic stimulated the development of virtual wards across the British NHS.  Patients are managed at home, monitoring their own oxygen levels using an oxygen saturation probe if necessary and supported by telephone.  The trust managed more than 350 patients from its 3 hospital sites at home in March 2020. The trust was also responsible for running the temporary NHS Nightingale Hospital North West hospital, located in Manchester.

In January 2021 the trust established a 15-year technology partnership with Siemens Healthineers with a value of approximately £125 million covering more than 350 radiology installations across eight hospital sites.

Overseas patients 
The trust issued invoices to patients thought to be ineligible for NHS treatment totalling £2.1 million in 2018–9, but only collected £0.3 million.

References

External links 

 
 Manchester University NHS Foundation Trust on the NHS website
 Care Quality Commission inspection reports

 
Health in Greater Manchester